The 1960 Arkansas Razorbacks football team represented the University of Arkansas in the Southwest Conference (SWC) during the 1960 NCAA University Division football season. In their third year under head coach Frank Broyles, the Razorbacks compiled an 8–3 record (6–1 against SWC opponents), won the SWC championship, and outscored all opponents by a combined total of 185 to 87.  The Razorbacks' only losses during the regular season came against Baylor by a 28–14 score and to Mississippi by a 10–7 score. The team was ranked #7 in both the final AP Poll and the final UPI Coaches Poll and went on to lose to Duke in the 1960 Cotton Bowl Classic by a 7–6 score.

Lineman Wayne Harris was selected by the Football Writers Association of America as a first-team player on the 1960 All-America Team. He was also honored as a second-team player by the UPI.  Halfback Lance Alworth was recognized as a third-team All-American by the American Football Coaches Association.

Schedule

References

Arkansas
Arkansas Razorbacks football seasons
Southwest Conference football champion seasons
Arkansas Razorbacks football